The Gándara (also known as the Soba River) is a river in Green Spain, at the north of the country. It flows through the autonomous community of Cantabria and discharges into the Asón River. The Gándara offers trout fishing.

The river's name comes from the plains where it is born, known as La Gándara, under the Becerral crag. It flows from west to east until it reaches the Bolea and Regules bridge, where it changes direction towards the north. Not much later it changes again, to the east. In some areas, it detours round steep mountains; sometimes it plunges from considerable heights.

See also 
 List of rivers of Spain

Rivers of Spain
Rivers of Cantabria